{{DISPLAYTITLE:C6H13Br}}
The molecular formula C6H13Br (molar mass: 165.07 g/mol, exact mass: 164.0201 u) may refer to:

 1-Bromohexane
 2-Bromohexane